Muthalamada may refer to

 Muthalamada-I, a village in Palakkad district, Kerala, India
 Muthalamada-II, a village in Palakkad district, Kerala, India
 Muthalamada (gram panchayat), a gram panchayat serving the above villages